The 2013 Critérium du Dauphiné was the sixty-fifth running of the Critérium du Dauphiné cycling stage race; a race, organised by the Amaury Sport Organisation, rated as a World Tour event on the UCI calendar, the highest classification such an event can have. The race consisted of eight stages, beginning in Champéry on 2 June – the first such start for the race in Switzerland – and concluding in Risoul on 9 June, and was the sixteenth race of the 2013 UCI World Tour season. The Dauphiné was viewed as a great preparation for July's Tour de France and a number of the contenders for the general classification of the Tour participated in the Dauphiné. It featured mountainous stages as well as an individual time trial similar in length to the Tour.

The race was won by Great Britain's Chris Froome of  – the third successive year that the squad had won the race, after Bradley Wiggins' victories in 2011 and 2012. Froome took the overall lead of the race after winning the fifth stage, and maintained his advantage to the end of the race to win his fourth stage race of the 2013 season. Ultimately, Froome won the general classification by 58 seconds over runner-up and team-mate Richie Porte, a domestique for Froome in the mountainous stages on the route.

In the race's other classifications, 's Rohan Dennis was the winner of the white jersey for the young rider classification as he was the highest placed rider born in 1988 or later, finishing in eighth place overall. Despite not winning any stages during the race, Gianni Meersman of  won the green jersey, for the winner of the points classification – gained at intermediate sprints and stage finishes – while the red and white polka-dotted jersey for the King of the Mountains classification went to  rider Thomas Damuseau.

Teams
As the Critérium du Dauphiné was a UCI World Tour event, all UCI ProTeams were invited automatically and obligated to send a squad. Originally, eighteen ProTeams were invited to the race, with four other squads given wildcard places.   were not originally invited to the race,  but when they later regained their ProTour status after an appeal to the Court of Arbitration for Sport, the race organisers announced their inclusion, bringing the total number of teams competing to twenty-three.

During May's Giro d'Italia, Sylvain Georges tested positive for the vasodilator heptaminol, after the seventh stage; his positive test was the second by a rider from the  squad in the space of a year, after Steve Houanard tested positive for the glycoprotein hormone erythropoietin (EPO) in an out-of-competition test in September 2012. Since the team was a member of the Mouvement pour un cyclisme crédible union, a second positive test meant that, according to the union's regulations, they had to stop racing for eight days. The team voluntarily withdrew from the Dauphiné, avoiding a financial penalty which could have been incurred by the team for failing to compete in a World Tour event, against UCI regulations. As a result, the peloton was reduced to the following twenty-two teams.

Schedule
The route for the race was announced on 15 April 2013.

Stages

Stage 1
2 June 2013 — Champéry (Switzerland) to Champéry (Switzerland), 

Despite starting and finishing in the village of Champéry – the first occasion that the race had started in Switzerland in its history – most of the opening stage of the 2013 Critérium du Dauphiné was just over the Franco-Swiss border in the Haute-Savoie department, where the previous year's race had finished. After a slight descent from the start, the race's first climb commenced after just  of racing, with the first-category Côte de Morgins, a -long, 6% climb. After a long and steady descent, another first-category climb of the Col du Corbier – which featured in the 2012 Dauphiné-ending stage – was ascented, a  test at an average of 7.5%. On the return loop to Champéry, after passing through the intermediate sprint at La Chapelle-d'Abondance, the Côte de Morgins was climbed from the other side (this time as a second-category climb), before a third-category climb – the Côte de Champéry – just a kilometre from the finish. This  parcours, especially the closing kilometres, was expected to see sprinters being dropped from the peloton, resulting in a select group of riders at the finish.

The day's breakaway was initiated at the front of the day's opening climb, the Côte de Morgins, with the initial move being made by  rider David Veilleux. Behind them, Tony Martin set off in pursuit of the four leaders, but was not able to reach the lead group at any point. Veilleux remained well clear into the closing stages, and eventually came across the line to take the biggest win of his career – his first win at World Tour level – by almost two minutes. In doing so, Veilleux claimed the race lead in the general, points and mountains classifications. The remaining members of the breakaway were caught, and this allowed Martin's team-mate Gianni Meersman to take second, ahead of 's Tom-Jelte Slagter, who was the best-placed young rider.

Stage 2
3 June 2013 — Châtel to Oyonnax, 

Although categorised as a flat stage by the race organisers, the second half of the  parcours was set to test whether the sprinters could with remain with the peloton all the way to the finish in Oyonnax. Five of the day's six categorised climbs came in a  portion of the route, with the last of these – the second-category Col du Sentier – coming with just  remaining of the stage. The Col du Sentier was the day's steepest climb, with an average gradient of 7.6%, and was one of two second-category ascents, along with the -long Côte de Communal (6.3%) around  prior. The descent into Oyonnax was fast, before a gradual rise to the finish.

Four separate riders attempted to make solo breakaways early in the stage, but it was not until the  point that a group was able to separate from the peloton. Joining Damuseau in the group initially were 's Arnaud Gérard and  rider Rudy Molard, while a fourth rider, José Mendes, was able to bridge up to the group from the peloton. With three-quarters of the group being within two minutes of Veilleux after the opening stage, the peloton were unwilling to give the group too much distance on the road, and the gap peaked at no more than five minutes, just after halfway.

Veilleux's team maintained the pace in the peloton, pulling the group back as Damuseau led the leaders over the top of the first four climbs, but the quartet held a lead of less than a minute at the foot of the Côte du Bugnon. Molard's resistance lasted until the bottom of the final climb, the Col du Sentier, when the peloton sped by. Veilleux finished within the peloton to maintain his race lead by 1' 56" over Meersman.

Stage 3
4 June 2013 — Ambérieu-en-Bugey to Tarare, 

The third stage of the race was split into two distinctive sections; the first portion of the -long stage from the start town of Ambérieu-en-Bugey was predominantly flat as the race headed towards the feeding zone in the commune of Lancié. From there, the route moved uphill towards the first of the day's two categorised climbs. The summit of the climb came  before the finish into Tarare; the finish was technical, with two tight left-hand turns in the final kilometre.

The quartet pulled clear to a maximum advantage of around seven minutes early in the stage. This was steadily brought down by the team-mates of the race leader David Veilleux and the  team for their sprinter Gianni Meersman.  also aided with the chase for Nacer Bouhanni, and the peloton was within a minute of the leaders at the intermediate sprint in Cublize. Cordeel was the last member of the group to be caught, just as he commenced the Col des Sauvages. With a lead-out from team-mate Geraint Thomas, Edvald Boasson Hagen finished strongest to take the stage win – the third Dauphiné win of his career – ahead of 's Michael Matthews and Meersman.

Stage 4
5 June 2013 — Villars-les-Dombes to Parc des Oiseaux, individual time trial (ITT)

The race's only individual time trial of an extensive length was held as an out-and-back loop around Villars-les-Dombes in the Ain department. The parcours of the -long stage was almost entirely flat. The stage finished at the Parc des Oiseaux, one of the largest ornithological parks in Europe. Race organisers had expected the quickest times for the course to be around forty minutes. Several of the general classification leaders regarded the time trial as a test for an individual time trial of similar length due to be held in July, at the Tour de France. As is customary in time trial stages, cyclists set off in reverse order from where they were ranked in the general classification at the end of the previous stage.

Warbasse recorded a time of 42' 43" for the course, but his stay at the top was almost immediately beaten by 's Mitchell Docker. Docker had started two minutes behind Warbasse – riders had started the stage at one-minute intervals – and nearly caught him towards the end, having already passed his team-mate Yannick Eijssen on the course.  rider Alexander Wetterhall was the next rider to record the fastest time, setting a benchmark of 40' 19"; Jack Bauer was the first rider to break the expected fastest time, recording a sub-40 minute time for the parcours, as the  rider went top with 39' 33".

Teruel's team-mate Jonathan Castroviejo almost recorded the first time below 38 minutes, falling a couple of seconds shy with a time of 38' 02", but was still almost half a minute clear of the best time to that point, set by Bárta. His time was to be beaten by only three riders, the first of which was the eventual stage-winning time recorded by the world champion Tony Martin, riding for the  team. Martin was comfortably quickest at each of the two intermediate time-checks along the route, and crossed the line over a minute clear of Castroviejo; he had recorded a time of 36' 54". Martin's winning time allowed him to claim his sixth individual time trial victory of 2013.  rider Rohan Dennis recorded the second-fastest time for the course at 37' 41", and by doing so, became the new leader of the Dauphiné by five seconds, from 's Chris Froome – the best of the general classification contenders, and one of four  riders in the top six – as Veilleux lost more than three minutes on the course.

Stage 5
6 June 2013 — Grésy-sur-Aix to Valmorel, 

The fifth stage was the first to be categorised as a mountain stage, with a summit finish at the ski resort of Valmorel, just outside Les Avanchers. After an opening loop around the start town of Grésy-sur-Aix, the Côte de Trévignin was the first of four categorised climbs on the day's route. The climb of  averaged 6.6% over the ascent, and from there the race progressed to the Massif des Bauges. After a period of undulating terrain, the short, sharp fourth-category Col du Frêne was next on the route, at 6% over just under  of climbing. After the descent down to Saint-Pierre-d'Albigny, the  parcours headed towards Valmorel via Albertville, the intermediate sprint point at La Bâthie and the fourth-category Côte de la Croix.

The lead gap went over five minutes at one point during the stage, but was around half that as the leaders approached the final climb of the day. Tim Wellens and 's Daniel Teklehaymanot set the pace at the foot of the climb, before Wellens attacked on his own. 's Matthew Busche was able to bridge back up to Wellens, before dropping him.

Behind,  were leading the main group up the Montée de Valmorel, with the pace dislodging numerous riders. Alejandro Valverde attempted to chase down Busche, but was brought back with less than  remaining. After losing time in the previous day's time trial, Alberto Contador of  attacked the group, but was chased down by 's Chris Froome; Froome and Contador were able to catch Busche in the closing stages, with Froome kicking on to take the stage victory and the race leader's yellow and blue jersey, as Dennis had been dropped in the final  of the stage. Dennis ultimately fell to third in the general classification, as Froome's team-mate Richie Porte was also able to move ahead by two seconds, but he maintained his lead in the young rider classification.

Stage 6
7 June 2013 — La Léchère to Grenoble, 

After a near-flat opening , which included the day's intermediate sprint at Albertville, the race moved towards the hills, with four categorised climbs within a  period. After a speedy descent, the riders climbed once again, with the second-category Col des Ayes averaging over 8%. Another short, sharp climb of the Col des Mouilles finished the categorised climbing for the day.

A three-rider move built up an advantage of over two minutes, after which  took up station on the front of the peloton to get a rider clear. The rider in question was Thomas Voeckler, who managed to catch the original breakaway, and passed them on the road. Voeckler was later joined by seven other riders as they were ascending the Col du Barioz. The best placed rider of the octet was  rider Alexandre Geniez, who trailed the overnight leader of the general classification, Chris Froome, by 3' 41"; despite this, Froome's squad kept the gap in check, with the difference not going over three minutes.

The lead group then splintered, as the 's José Herrada attacked on his own. Geniez later dropped back, which allowed for a slight lull in the chase, allowing the leaders to increase the gap from just over a minute to a minute-and-a-half. The gap remained at around a minute as the race entered Grenoble, which enabled the breakaway to battle it out for the honours. After several half-hearted moves, Voeckler was the only rider to launch a sizable move; he ultimately won the stage, ahead of Herrada, Seeldraeyers and Silin.  sprinter Edvald Boasson Hagen won the bunch sprint, 46 seconds later, as team-mate Froome kept the race lead.

Stage 7
8 June 2013 — Le Pont-de-Claix to SuperDévoluy, 

The queen stage of the 2013 Critérium du Dauphiné, the penultimate stage steadily rose out of the start town in Le Pont-de-Claix towards the first of the day's five categorised climbs. An immediate long descent followed, before the first-category Col d'Ornon, which averaged 6.1% over its  duration. The riders enjoyed a respite from the climbs for around an hour across the Valbonnais, passing through the intermediate sprint at Corps.

A group of twenty-two riders (from seventeen teams) formed the day's breakaway, and were around three minutes clear by the time they reached the foot of the climb to Alpe d'Huez. The gap rose to around four minutes by the summit of the climb – led over the top by 's Thomas De Gendt – which allowed Kevin Seeldraeyers to become the virtual leader of the general classification. The breakaway began to splinter on the Col d'Ornon, as the advantage over the main field continued to rise, to over five minutes. 's Sylvain Chavanel and  rider Alessandro De Marchi moved clear ahead of the Col du Noyer, and managed to pull around a minute-and-a-half clear of the rest of the breakaway by the foot of the climb.

The two riders worked well together and managed to build a gap of about twenty seconds prior to the final climb, remaining clear until the finish. Sánchez out-sprinted Fuglsang at the end for his first win of the year; a win he later dedicated to his former team-mate Víctor Cabedo, who had died in a training accident in September 2012.

Stage 8
9 June 2013 — Sisteron to Risoul, 

The final stage of the 2013 Critérium du Dauphiné was a categorised medium-mountain stage  in length. Having rolled out of the start town of Sisteron, the parcours headed towards Gigors via some rolling terrain, and after a descent, set up for the first of three categorised climbs: the Côte de la Bréole, averaging around 5% for its  length. Having passed through the feed zone at Le Lauzet-Ubaye, the road steadily rose towards the foot of the second climb, the first-category Col de Vars. From the summit, the route descended towards Guillestre and ultimately, the start of the final climb to Risoul, a steady almost- climb, maxing at around 9%, but averaging 6.7% for its duration. The climb had previously featured in the 2010 edition of the race, where Nicolas Vogondy soloed to victory.

For the second day running, a large breakaway group formed for the primary break of the day. A total of 24 riders, including members of 17 of the race's 22 teams, were part of the group at its largest. The group included mountains classification leader Thomas Damuseau, who set about securing an unassailable advantage in the standings. He led over the top of the Côte de la Bréole, as the peloton allowed them an advantage of around three-and-a-half minutes.

This quintet held an advantage of approaching three minutes, as they headed towards the final climb in the treacherous conditions that had been prominent throughout the stage. Wellens attacked at the foot of the climb, and managed to acquire a gap over around 30 seconds halfway up, but had been tiring quickly. This fatigue allowed De Marchi to rejoin him, and ultimately pass him on the road. , leading the peloton in protection of the overall leader Chris Froome, were setting a fast pace in the group, and the pace forced Michael Rogers to be distanced, putting his third place overall under threat. Froome and team-mate Richie Porte soon gained ground off the front of the peloton, further securing the duo's one-two finish in the overall standings. They set off in chase of De Marchi, but he ultimately prevailed for his first professional victory, finishing 24 seconds clear of the nearest rider. Froome finished second, ahead of 's Andrew Talansky, who caught Froome and passed Porte in the closing metres; Froome thus secured the overall lead, missed out on the points title by two points to Meersman Rogers faded to sixth overall, which handed Daniel Moreno the final place on the podium.

Classification leadership

In the 2013 Critérium du Dauphiné, four different jerseys were awarded. For the general classification, calculated by adding each cyclist's finishing times on each stage, the leader received a yellow jersey with a blue bar. This classification was considered the most important of the 2013 Critérium du Dauphiné, and the winner of the classification was considered the winner of the race.

Additionally, there was a points classification, which awarded a green jersey. In the points classification, cyclists got points for finishing in the top 10 in a stage. For all stages, the win earned 15 points, second place earned 12 points, third 10, fourth 8, fifth 6, and one point fewer per place down to a single point for 10th. Points towards the classification could also be achieved at each of the intermediate sprints; these points were given to the top three riders through the line with 5 points for first, 3 for second, and 1 point for third.

There was also a mountains classification, the leadership of which was marked by a red and white polka-dot jersey. In the mountains classification, points were won by reaching the top of a climb before other cyclists. Each climb was categorised as either hors, first, second, third, or fourth-category, with more points available for the higher-categorised climbs. Hors catégorie climbs awarded the most points, with 20 points on offer for the first rider across the summit; the first ten riders were able to accrue points towards the mountains classification, compared with the first eight on first-category passes and the first six riders on second-category climbs. Fewer points were on offer for the smaller hills, marked as third-category or fourth-category.

The fourth jersey represented the young rider classification, marked by a white jersey. This was decided the same way as the general classification, but only riders born after 1 January 1988 were eligible to be ranked in the classification. There was also a classification for teams, in which the times of the best three cyclists per team on each stage were added together; the leading team at the end of the race was the team with the lowest total time.

References

External links

Critérium du Dauphiné
Criterium du Dauphine
Critérium du Dauphiné
Critérium du Dauphiné
Critérium du Dauphiné